The 2022 Four Continents Speed Skating Championships were held from 15 to 17 December 2021 at the Olympic Oval in Calgary, Canada.

Schedule 
All times are local (UTC–7).

Medal summary

Medal table

Men's events

Women's events

Participating nations
A total of 60 speed skaters from 9 nations contested the events. The numbers in parenthesis represents the number of participants entered.

 (1)
 (1)
 (13)
 (4)
 (11)
 (1)
 (14)
 (2)
 (13)

References 

2022
2021 in speed skating
2021 in Canadian sports
Sports competitions in Calgary
International speed skating competitions hosted by Canada
December 2021 sports events in Canada